Saccharicrinis marinus is a Gram-negative, non-endospore-forming and rod-shaped bacterium from the genus Saccharicrinis which has been isolated from marine sediments from Weihai in China.

References

External links
Type strain of Labilibacter marinus at BacDive -  the Bacterial Diversity Metadatabase

Bacteria described in 2015
Bacteroidia